This is a list of railway stations in the Dutch province Flevoland:

Current stations 
 Almere Buiten railway station
 Almere Centrum railway station
 Almere Muziekwijk railway station
 Almere Oostvaarders railway station
 Almere Parkwijk railway station
 Almere Poort railway station
 Dronten railway station
 Lelystad Centrum railway station

Future stations 
 Lelystad Zuid railway station

Closed stations 
 Almere Strand railway station

See also
 Railway stations in the Netherlands

 
Flev
Flevoland-related lists